In mathematics, the tensor product of modules is a construction that allows arguments about bilinear maps (e.g. multiplication) to be carried out in terms of linear maps. The module construction is analogous to the construction of the tensor product of vector spaces, but can be carried out for a pair of modules over a commutative ring resulting in a third module, and also for a pair of a right-module and a left-module over any ring, with result an abelian group. Tensor products are important in areas of abstract algebra, homological algebra, algebraic topology, algebraic geometry, operator algebras and noncommutative geometry. The universal property of the tensor product of vector spaces extends to more general situations in abstract algebra. The tensor product of an algebra and a module can be used for extension of scalars. For a commutative ring, the tensor product of modules can be iterated to form the tensor algebra of a module, allowing one to define multiplication in the module in a universal way.

Balanced product

For a ring R, a right R-module M, a left R-module N, and an abelian group G, a map  is said to be R-balanced, R-middle-linear or an R-balanced product if for all m, m′ in M, n, n′ in N, and r in R the following hold:

If φ, ψ are balanced products, then each of the operations  and −φ defined pointwise is a balanced product. This turns the set  into an abelian group.

For M and N fixed, the map  is a functor from the category of abelian groups to itself.

Remarks
Properties (Dl) and (Dr) express biadditivity of φ, which may be regarded as distributivity of φ over addition.
Property (A) resembles some associative property of φ.
Every ring R is an R-bimodule. So the ring multiplication  in R is an R-balanced product .

Definition
For a ring R, a right R-module M, a left R-module N, the tensor product over R

is an abelian group together with a balanced product (as defined above)

which is universal in the following sense:

For every abelian group G and every balanced product  there is a unique group homomorphism  such that 

Indeed, the mapping ⊗ is called canonical, or more explicitly: the canonical mapping (or balanced product) of the tensor product.

The tensor product can also be defined as a representing object for the functor ; explicitly, this means there is a natural isomorphism:

This is a succinct way of stating the universal mapping property given above. (If a priori one is given this natural isomorphism, then  can be recovered by taking  and then mapping the identity map.)

Similarly, given the natural identification , one can also define  by the formula

This is known as the tensor-hom adjunction; see also .

For each x in M, y in N, one writes

for the image of (x, y) under the canonical map . It is often called a pure tensor. Strictly speaking, the correct notation would be x ⊗R y but it is conventional to drop R here. Then, immediately from the definition, there are relations:

The universal property of a tensor product has the following important consequence:

Hence, by the uniqueness part of the universal property, q = 0. The second statement is because to define a module homomorphism, it is enough to define it on the generating set of the module.

Application of the universal property of tensor products

Determining whether a tensor product of modules is zero

In practice, it is sometimes more difficult to show that a tensor product of R-modules  is nonzero than it is to show that it is 0. The universal property gives a convenient way for checking this. 

To check that a tensor product  is nonzero, one can construct an R-bilinear map  to an abelian group  such that . This works because if , then .

For equivalent modules 

The proposition says that one can work with explicit elements of the tensor products instead of invoking the universal property directly each time. This is very convenient in practice. For example, if R is commutative and the left and right actions by R on modules are considered to be equivalent, then  can naturally be furnished with the R-scalar multiplication by extending

to the whole  by the previous proposition (strictly speaking, what is needed is a bimodule structure not commutativity; see a paragraph below). Equipped with this R-module structure,  satisfies a universal property similar to the above: for any R-module G, there is a natural isomorphism:

If R is not necessarily commutative but if M has a left action by a ring S (for example, R), then  can be given the left S-module structure, like above, by the formula

Analogously, if N has a right action by a ring S, then  becomes a right S-module.

Tensor product of linear maps and a change of base ring

The construction has a consequence that tensoring is a functor: each right R-module M determines the functor

If  is a ring homomorphism and if M is a right S-module and N a left S-module, then there is the canonical surjective homomorphism:

induced by 

 

The resulting map is surjective since pure tensors  generate the whole module. In particular, taking R to be  this shows every tensor product of modules is a quotient of a tensor product of abelian groups.

Several modules
(This section need to be updated. For now, see  for the more general discussion.)

It is possible to extend the definition to a tensor product of any number of modules over the same commutative ring. For example, the universal property of

is that each trilinear map on

corresponds to a unique linear map

The binary tensor product is associative: (M1 ⊗ M2) ⊗ M3 is naturally isomorphic to M1 ⊗ (M2 ⊗ M3). The tensor product of three modules defined by the universal property of trilinear maps is isomorphic to both of these iterated tensor products.

Properties

Modules over general rings
Let R1, R2, R3, R be rings, not necessarily commutative.

For an R1-R2-bimodule M12 and a left R2-module M20,  is a left R1-module.
For a right R2-module M02 and an R2-R3-bimodule M23,  is a right R3-module.
(associativity) For a right R1-module M01, an R1-R2-bimodule M12, and a left R2-module M20 we have: 
Since R is an R-R-bimodule, we have  with the ring multiplication  as its canonical balanced product.

Modules over commutative rings
Let R be a commutative ring, and M, N and P be R-modules. Then

(identity) 
(associativity)  Thus  is well-defined.
(symmetry)  In fact, for any permutation σ of the set {1, ..., n}, there is a unique isomorphism: 
(distributive property)  In fact,  for an index set I of arbitrary cardinality.
(commutes with finite product) for any finitely many , 
(commutes with localization) for any multiplicatively closed subset S of R,  as -module.
(commutes with base extension) If S is an R-algebra, writing ,  cf. .
(commutes with direct limit) for any direct system of R-modules Mi, 
(tensoring is right exact) if   is an exact sequence of R-modules, then  is an exact sequence of R-modules, where  This is a consequence of:
(adjoint relation) .

Then M is the direct sum 
and the same for N. By the distributive property, one has:

Even if M is not free, a free presentation of M can be used to compute tensor products.

The tensor product, in general, does not commute with inverse limit: on the one hand,

(cf. "examples"). On the other hand,

where  are the ring of p-adic integers and the field of p-adic numbers. See also "profinite integer" for an example in the similar spirit.

If R is not commutative, the order of tensor products could matter in the following way: we "use up" the right action of M and the left action of N to form the tensor product ; in particular,  would not even be defined.

The associativity holds more generally for non-commutative rings: if M is a right R-module, N a (R, S)-module and P a left S-module, then

as abelian group.

The general form of adjoint relation of tensor products says: if R is not necessarily commutative, M is a right R-module, N is a (R, S)-module, P is a right S-module, then as abelian group

where  is given by

Tensor product of an R-module with the fraction field
Let R be an integral domain with fraction field K.

For any R-module M,  as R-modules, where  is the torsion submodule of M.
If M is a torsion R-module then  and if M is not a torsion module then .
In particular,  where .
 where  is the localization of the module  at the prime ideal  (i.e., the localization with respect to the nonzero elements).

Extension of scalars

The adjoint relation in the general form has an important special case: for any R-algebra S, M a right R-module, P a right S-module, using , we have the natural isomorphism:

This says that the functor  is a left adjoint to the forgetful functor , which restricts an S-action to an R-action. Because of this,  is often called the extension of scalars from R to S. In the representation theory, when R, S are group algebras, the above relation becomes the Frobenius reciprocity.

Examples

 for any R-algebra S (i.e., a free module remains free after extending scalars.)
For a commutative ring  and a commutative R-algebra S, we have:  in fact, more generally,   where  is an ideal.
Using  the previous example and the Chinese remainder theorem, we have as rings  This gives an example when a tensor product is a direct product.

Examples
The structure of a tensor product of quite ordinary modules may be unpredictable.

Let G be an abelian group in which every element has finite order (that is G is a torsion abelian group; for example G can be a finite abelian group or ). Then:

Indeed, any  is of the form

Similarly, one sees

Here are some identities useful for calculation: Let R be a commutative ring, I, J ideals, M, N R-modules. Then
. If M is flat, .
 (because tensoring commutes with base extensions)
.

Example: If G is an abelian group, ; this follows from 1.

Example: ; this follows from 3. In particular, for distinct prime numbers p, q,

Tensor products can be applied to control the order of elements of groups. Let G be an abelian group. Then the multiples of 2 in

are zero.

Example: Let  be the group of n-th roots of unity. It is a cyclic group and cyclic groups are classified by orders. Thus, non-canonically,  and thus, when g is the gcd of n and m,

whose kernel is generated by elements of the form 
where r, s, x, u are integers and s is nonzero. Since

the kernel actually vanishes; hence, 

As -vector space,  has dimension 4, but  has dimension 2. 

Like in the previous example, we have:  as abelian group and thus as -vector space (any -linear map between -vector spaces is -linear). As -vector space,  has dimension (cardinality of a basis) of continuum. Hence,  has a -basis indexed by a product of continuums; thus its -dimension is continuum. Hence, for dimension reason, there is a non-canonical isomorphism of -vector spaces:

Consider the modules  for  irreducible polynomials such that  Then,

Another useful family of examples comes from changing the scalars. Notice that

Good examples of this phenomenon to look at are when

Construction
The construction of  takes a quotient of a free abelian group with basis the symbols , used here to denote the ordered pair , for m in M and n in N by the subgroup generated by all elements of the form
 −m ∗ (n + n′) + m ∗ n + m ∗ n′
 −(m + m′) ∗ n + m ∗ n + m′ ∗ n
 (m · r) ∗ n − m ∗ (r · n)
where m, m′ in M, n, n′ in N, and r in R. The quotient map which takes  to the coset containing ; that is,

is balanced, and the subgroup has been chosen minimally so that this map is balanced. The universal property of ⊗ follows from the universal properties of a free abelian group and a quotient.

More category-theoretically, let σ be the given right action of R on M; i.e., σ(m, r) = m · r and τ the left action of R of N. Then, provided the tensor product of abelian groups is already defined, the tensor product of M and N over R can be defined as the coequalizer:

where  without a subscript refers to the tensor product of abelian groups.

In the construction of the tensor product over a commutative ring R, the R-module structure can be built in from the start by forming the quotient of a free R-module by the submodule generated by the elements given above for the general construction, augmented by the elements . Alternately, the general construction can be given a Z(R)-module structure by defining the scalar action by  when this is well-defined, which is precisely when r ∈ Z(R), the centre of R.

The direct product of M and N is rarely isomorphic to the tensor product of M and N. When R is not commutative, then the tensor product requires that M and N be modules on opposite sides, while the direct product requires they be modules on the same side.

As linear maps
In the general case, not all the properties of a tensor product of vector spaces extend to modules. Yet, some useful properties of the tensor product, considered as module homomorphisms, remain.

Dual module

The canonical structure is the pointwise operations of addition and scalar multiplication. Thus, E∗ is the set of all R-linear maps  (also called linear forms), with operations

The dual of a left R-module is defined analogously, with the same notation.

There is always a canonical homomorphism  from E to its second dual. It is an isomorphism if E is a free module of finite rank. In general, E is called a reflexive module if the canonical homomorphism is an isomorphism.

Duality pairing
We denote the natural pairing of its dual E∗ and a right R-module E, or of a left R-module F and its dual F∗ as

The pairing is left R-linear in its left argument, and right R-linear in its right argument:

An element as a (bi)linear map
In the general case, each element of the tensor product of modules gives rise to a left R-linear map, to a right R-linear map, and to an R-bilinear form. Unlike the commutative case, in the general case the tensor product is not an R-module, and thus does not support scalar multiplication.

 Given right R-module E and right R-module F, there is a canonical homomorphism  such that  is the map .

 Given left R-module E and right R-module F, there is a canonical homomorphism  such that  is the map .

Both cases hold for general modules, and become isomorphisms if the modules E and F are restricted to being finitely generated projective modules (in particular free modules of finite ranks). Thus, an element of a tensor product of modules over a ring R maps canonically onto an R-linear map, though as with vector spaces, constraints apply to the modules for this to be equivalent to the full space of such linear maps.

 Given right R-module E and left R-module F, there is a canonical homomorphism  such that  is the map . Thus, an element of a tensor product ξ ∈ F∗ ⊗R E∗ may be thought of giving rise to or acting as an R-bilinear map .

Trace
Let R be a commutative ring and E an R-module. Then there is a canonical R-linear map:

If E is a finitely generated projective R-module, then one can identify  through the canonical homomorphism mentioned above and then the above is the trace map:

When R is a field, this is the usual trace of a linear transformation.

Example from differential geometry: tensor field
The most prominent example of a tensor product of modules in differential geometry is the tensor product of the spaces of vector fields and differential forms. More precisely, if R is the (commutative) ring of smooth functions on a smooth manifold M, then one puts

As R-modules,  is the dual module of 

To lighten the notation, put  and so . When p, q ≥ 1, for each (k, l) with 1 ≤ k ≤ p, 1 ≤ l ≤ q, there is an R-multilinear map:

where  means  and the hat means a term is omitted. By the universal property, it corresponds to a unique R-linear map:

It is called the contraction of tensors in the index (k, l). Unwinding what the universal property says one sees:

Remark: The preceding discussion is standard in textbooks on differential geometry (e.g., Helgason). In a way, the sheaf-theoretic construction (i.e., the language of sheaf of modules) is more natural and increasingly more common; for that, see the section .

Relationship to flat modules
In general, 

 

is a bifunctor which accepts a right and a left R module pair as input, and assigns them to the tensor product in the category of abelian groups.

By fixing a right R module M, a functor 

 

arises, and symmetrically a left R module N could be fixed to create a functor 

Unlike the Hom bifunctor  the tensor functor is covariant in both inputs.

By definition, a module T is a flat module if  is an exact functor.

If M is a flat module, the functor  is exact by the very definition of a flat module. If the tensor products are taken over a field F, we are in the case of vector spaces as above. Since all F modules are flat, the bifunctor  is exact in both positions, and the two given generating sets are bases, then  indeed forms a basis for

Additional structure

In this setting, the tensor product become a fibered coproduct in the category of commutative R-algebras. (But it is not a coproduct in the category of R-algebras.) 

If M and N are both R-modules over a commutative ring, then their tensor product is again an R-module. If R is a ring, RM is a left R-module, and the commutator

of any two elements r and s of R is in the annihilator of M, then we can make M into a right R module by setting

The action of R on M factors through an action of a quotient commutative ring. In this case the tensor product of M with itself over R is again an R-module. This is a very common technique in commutative algebra.

Generalization

Tensor product of complexes of modules
If X, Y are complexes of R-modules (R a commutative ring), then their tensor product is the complex given by

with the differential given by: for x in Xi and y in Yj,

Tensor product of sheaves of modules

The tensor product of sheaves of modules is the sheaf associated to the pre-sheaf of the tensor products of the modules of sections over open subsets.

In this setup, for example, one can define a tensor field on a smooth manifold M as a (global or local) section of the tensor product (called tensor bundle)

where O is the sheaf of rings of smooth functions on M and the bundles  are viewed as locally free sheaves on M.

The exterior bundle on M is the subbundle of the tensor bundle consisting of all antisymmetric covariant tensors. Sections of the exterior bundle are differential forms on M.

One important case when one forms a tensor product over a sheaf of non-commutative rings appears in theory of D-modules; that is, tensor products over the sheaf of differential operators.

See also
Tor functor
Tensor product of algebras
Tensor product of fields
derived tensor product

Notes

References

 Bourbaki, Algebra

.
.
 Peter May (1999), A concise course in algebraic topology, University of Chicago Press.

Module theory
Multilinear algebra
Homological algebra
Operations on structures